Westchester Station  is a community in the Canadian province of Nova Scotia, located in  Cumberland County. Eagle Hill Cemetery is located in the community.

References

Communities in Cumberland County, Nova Scotia
General Service Areas in Nova Scotia